This is a list of people who were awarded the title Hero of the Soviet Union two times. 154 people were double recipients of the award, three people were awarded it  three times, and two people were awarded it four times.

See also

References

Heroes of the Soviet Union lists